The Holme Moss transmitting station is a radio transmitting station at Holme Moss in West Yorkshire, England. The mast provides VHF coverage of both FM and DAB to a wide area around the mast including Derbyshire, Greater Manchester, South Yorkshire and West Yorkshire.

History 
Holme Moss transmitting station was built by British Insulated Callender's Cables with John Laing & Son acting as sub-contractors for the foundations. It became the BBC's third public television transmitter, launched on 12 October 1951. Of historic and technical interest, this operated on the 405 line VHF system, with black and white transmissions originally on British System A, Channel 2, with vision 51.75 MHz, 45 kW and sound 48.25 MHz, 12 kW.  The mast survived until the end of the Band I TV broadcasts in 1985, with a replacement mast being constructed, adjacent, in 1984. In early 1986, there was concern that heavy blocks of ice could bring down the old mast - February 1986 had been one of the coldest months on record, but demolition contractors worried that a sudden burst of warm weather could loosen lumps of ice,  with the shock of the fall possibly buckling the old mast at its badly rusted centre. This in turn threatened to damage the new mast just 100 yards away and put all its FM broadcasts off air. In the event, a gradual thaw alleviated the problem, and the old mast was taken apart as planned.

The site is now owned and operated by Arqiva.

Television signals from Holme Moss travelled much further than their intended service area. The Isle of Man and parts of the Irish Republic, mainly Dublin and Wicklow, could receive a signal from Holme Moss for some years. Emley Moor and Moorside Edge masts can be seen from the location (Emley Moor from Holme Moss).

VHF Radio broadcasts started on 10 December 1956, for the Home, Light, Third Programme as they were then titled (see table). To this day, these three stations operate on exactly the same frequencies as they did in 1956.  Subsequently, BBC Local Radio services were added in the early 1970s.  With the awarding of a national commercial station, Classic FM is also broadcast. DAB transmissions also now originate from here.

These transmissions cover North West England (mainly Greater Manchester and Cheshire) and most of Yorkshire; however, signals can be heard as far south as London and as far north as Scotland, whilst coverage can also be heard in Ireland and mainland Europe.

The base of the station is 1,719 ft (524 m) above sea level and the mast another 750 ft (228 m) on top of that. This gives a maximum aerial height of 2,467 ft (752 m) which is one of the highest in the UK. The mast weighs 140 tons and is held up by 5 sets of stay levels.  At 250 kW ERP on the national channels, it is one of the most powerful VHF sites in the country.

Services available

Analogue radio (FM VHF)

Digital radio (DAB)

Analogue television
TV transmissions ceased from this site with the demise of the original VHF service in 1985.

Relay services
Being the main radio site in the North West and Yorkshire region, there are also a number of smaller relay transmitters used to fill in areas which receive poor coverage from Holme Moss. This is particularly evident around the Pennines where there are frequent hills meaning reception from Holme Moss is poor (especially indoors).

Analogue radio

Gallery

See also

 Holme Moss
 List of masts
 List of tallest buildings and structures in Great Britain

References

Sources

External links
 Holme Moss brings programmes on BBC Television and VHF Sound
 Entry for Holme Moss at The Transmission Gallery
 Info and pictures of Holme Moss
 Opening of the mast in 1951
 Holme Moss Transmitter at thebigtower.com

Buildings and structures in Kirklees
Mass media in Yorkshire
Transmitter sites in England